São Tomé and Príncipe elects on the national level a head of state – the president – and a legislature. The president is elected for a five-year term by the people. The National Assembly (Assembleia Nacional) has 55 members, elected for a four-year term in seven multi-member constituencies by proportional representation. São Tomé and Príncipe has a multi-party system. The next legislative elections take place in 2022. Elections also happen on the regional and municipal level.

Latest elections

Presidential

On 18 July 2021 the first round of the presidential election was held. As no presidential candidate received a majority of the vote, a second round was originally scheduled to be held on 8 August 2021. However, following an objection to the first-round result, the second round was postponed to 29 August 2021, and later postponed again to 5 September 2021.

The second round was won by Carlos Vila Nova of Independent Democratic Action, who received 58% of the vote, defeating Guilherme Posser da Costa of the MLSTP/PSD.

Legislative

On 7 October 2018 the Independent Democratic Action won 25 seats and the MLSTP/PSD won 23 seats of the 55 seats in the National Assembly.

See also
 Electoral calendar
 Electoral system

References

External links
Adam Carr's Election Archive
African Elections Database